Donna Marie Pokere-Phillips is a New Zealand politician known for her conspiracy-driven views. She is the co-leader of the NZ Outdoors & Freedom Party, and was their candidate in the 2022 Hamilton West by-election. She has also been an unsuccessful candidate in parliamentary elections for the Alliance (1999), The Opportunities Party (2017), and the Māori Party (Te Pāti Māori, 2020). In local politics she has made unsuccessful bids for Hamilton's mayoralty in 2022, and City Council seats in 2022 and 2021.

Early life and education
Pokere-Phillips (Tainui, Ngāti Tūwharetoa, Taranaki) was born in Taranaki.

She has a Master of Laws postgraduate degree from the University of Waikato, awarded in 2004.

Career

Alliance
In the 1999 election, Pokere-Phillips stood for the Alliance in the seat of Port Waikato and as number 40 on the party list. As the party only won 10 seats, and she failed to win her electorate, Pokere-Phillips was not elected.

The Opportunities Party
In the 2017 election, she stood for The Opportunities Party as their candidate in the seat of Hamilton West and as number 6 on the party list. As the party failed to win any seats, she was not elected.

In 2018, she ran for both leader of The Opportunities Party and as the membership representative on the TOP party board. She was not elected as party leader (she gained 11 of the 1000+ votes cast), but successfully became the membership representative. 

In May 2019 she accused party leader Geoff Simmons of misleading the party about payments he was receiving, claiming in a leaked 1700-word email that the party was financially unstable. Simmons' response was that "Our Party Secretary is an accountant and he assured her that wasn’t the case. But apparently she didn’t listen." On 12 August 2019, she departed from the party board.

Te Pāti Māori
Pokere-Phillips next joined the Māori Party (Te Pāti Māori) and was selected as the party's candidate in Hauraki-Waikato for the 2020 election. When addressing the COVID-19 pandemic in New Zealand, she accused the government of "ethnic cleansing", saying that there should have been more engagement with Māori leadership during the pandemic, that rights protected under Te Tiriti o Waitangi had been denied, and that rushed legislation had eroded civil liberties. During the campaign she was arrested for trespassing, having taken part in a protest against a new roading development.

In 2021 she was quoted in the media as a legal advisor to Brian Te Huia. Te Huia, who had 396 criminal convictions at the age of 54, alleged years of abuse while he'd been a child under state care. Pokere-Phillips' motivations at the time including giving a voice to a boy who has suffered under state care, and a "sense of justice" to the man he had grown into.

She stood unsuccessfully in a by-election for the Hamilton City Council east ward in 2021, gaining 247 of the 12,178 votes cast.

NZ Outdoors & Freedom Party
In 2022, Pokere-Phillips became co-leader of the NZ Outdoors & Freedom Party, alongside Sue Grey. Later that year she placed fourth in the 2022 Hamilton mayoral election and also failed to become one of the first two councillors for the city's new Maaori Ward. She was the sixth-placed candidate in the 2022 Hamilton West by-election, which was decided in December.

Covid-19 conspiracy theories
On social media Pokere-Phillips regularly shares misinformation about the COVID-19 vaccine, for example falsely claiming on Facebook that up to 3,000 deaths should have been attributed to the vaccination but weren't. She has also appeared on Counterspin Media, described by Radio New Zealand as a "far-right conspiracy theorist website that promotes anti-vax messages". On Counterspin she said believes that COVID-19 vaccines are "a bio-weapon that kills people" and that hospitals are "death camps". She said that she was running for mayor as an act of "political utu and I want this government gone." The Waikato Times noted that she didn't share this motivation in other public forums like election debates.

In the lead-up to New Zealand's 2022 civic elections, Voices for Freedom (VFF) urged members and followers to run for council positions in order to make New Zealand "ungovernable". The group advised that candidates should not declare any affiliation with VFF. When asked, Pokere-Phillips denied any affiliation with VFF.

Personal life
Pokere-Phillips has lived in Hamilton with her partner and five children for over 20 years.

References

Living people
New Zealand Māori women
People from Taranaki
University of Waikato alumni
Māori Party politicians
Alliance (New Zealand political party) politicians
The Opportunities Party politicians
Leaders of political parties in New Zealand
New Zealand Māori lawyers
New Zealand Māori women lawyers
Year of birth missing (living people)